William Zev Hassid (1899–1974) was a pioneer research scientist in sugar biochemistry, who announced the synthesis of sucrose in 1944. He received the Sugar Research Award of the National Academy of Sciences (jointly with Doudoroff and Barker) for this discovery in 1945.
He also received the Charles Reid Barnes Honorary Life Membership Award of the American Society of Plant Physiologists (1964), and the C. S. Hudson Award of the American Chemical Society (1967).
In 1972 he was recognized the Sixth International Symposium on Carbohydrate Chemistry as one of three outstanding senior American carbohydrate chemists.  Hassid served as a member of the National Academy of Sciences and the American Academy of Arts and Sciences, and as Chairman of the Division of Carbohydrate Chemistry of the American Chemical Society (1949–1950).

Personal life and career 
Hassid was born on October 1, 1899 in Jaffa, Palestine.  He emigrated to the United States in 1920. Hassid received A.B, M.S. and Ph.D. degrees from University of California, Berkeley in 1925, 1930 and 1934, respectively. Hassid spent all of his academic career at the University of California, Berkeley, and became research assistant of Dennis Robert Hoagland in 1927. He was appointed professor of plant nutrition in 1947, and professor of biochemistry in 1950. He retired in 1965 and until his death in 1974 he was professor emeritus.

References

External links 
 Guide to the William Zev Hassid Papers, 1915-1974 at The Bancroft Library
National Academy of Sciences Biographical Memoir

1899 births
1974 deaths
People from Jaffa
University of California, Berkeley alumni
Jewish American scientists
Jewish physicists
University of California, Berkeley faculty
Members of the United States National Academy of Sciences
20th-century American inventors
20th-century American Jews